Carolina Goldrusher is a steel roller coaster made by Arrow Dynamics of Mountain View, California.  The coaster is located in the Carolina Boardwalk area of Carowinds in Charlotte, North Carolina. It was the park's first roller coaster and one of only three original rides that still operate in the park today.

References

External links
Official Carolina Goldrusher page
Carolina Goldrusher at RCDB

Roller coasters in North Carolina
Roller coasters in South Carolina
Roller coasters operated by Cedar Fair
Roller coasters introduced in 1973
Carowinds